Vulvaland is the debut studio album by German electronica duo Mouse on Mars. It was released in 1994.

Critical reception

Sean Cooper of AllMusic described Vulvaland as "a wibbly, barely digital match of ambient texturology with experimental strains of techno, dub, and Krautrock."

In 2015, Fact included Vulvaland on its list of "21 Essential Records from Cologne's 90s Renaissance".

Track listing

Personnel
Credits adapted from liner notes.

Mouse on Mars
 Jan St. Werner – composition, arrangement, production
 Andi Toma – composition, arrangement, production

References

External links
 
 

1994 debut albums
Mouse on Mars albums
Too Pure albums
Rough Trade Records albums